Richard E. "Dick" Carver (born August 28, 1937) is an American politician who served as Mayor of Peoria, Illinois from 1973 to 1984 and United States Assistant Secretary of the Air Force (Financial Management & Comptroller) from 1984 to 1988.

Biography
Carver was born in Des Moines, Iowa, on August 28, 1937. He was educated at Bradley University, graduating with a B.S. in business administration in 1959, and was named a distinguished graduate in 1983.

After college, Carver became president of the Carver Lumber Company in Peoria, Illinois. He also served in the Air Force Reserve Command, eventually attaining the rank of colonel.

In 1969, Carver was elected to the Peoria City Council. After four years on City Council, Carver was elected Mayor of Peoria on April 3, 1973. He was re-elected on April 5, 1977. During his second term in office, he served as president of the United States Conference of Mayors 1979–80 and president of the National Conference of Republican Mayors. In 1980, he was a candidate to be United States Senator from Illinois, but lost the Republican primary to Dave O'Neal. He was re-elected to a third term as Mayor of Peoria on April 7, 1981, and subsequently held that office until 1984.

On April 14, 1978, President Jimmy Carter named Carver to a member of the Advisory Commission on Intergovernal Affairs, and on June 17, 1981, President Ronald Reagan named Carver a member of the President's Commission on Housing, a position he held until 1984. On August 11, 1984, President Reagan nominated Carver to be Assistant Secretary of the Air Force (Financial Management & Comptroller). Carver subsequently held this office until 1988.

Upon leaving government service in 1988, Carver became the president of ZF Industries while continuing to own Carver Lumber Company. He became President and CEO of MST America in January 1995. From November 1998 to April 2000, he was President and CEO of RPP America. He was a member of the Board of Directors of Competitive Technologies, Inc. from 2000 to 2007.

Carver Arena, a multi-purpose arena located in the Peoria Civic Center, is named after Carver. The first stages of the convention center were built during his tenure as Mayor.

References

1937 births
Living people
American chief executives
Bradley University alumni
Peoria, Illinois City Council members
Illinois Republicans
People from Des Moines, Iowa
Mayors of Peoria, Illinois
United States Air Force officers
Presidents of the United States Conference of Mayors
Military personnel from Illinois
Military personnel from Iowa